Matt DeGennaro is a former American football quarterback who played one season with the Connecticut Coyotes of the Arena Football League. He played college football at the University of Connecticut.

References

External links
Just Sports Stats

Living people
American football quarterbacks
UConn Huskies football players
Connecticut Coyotes players
1969 births